Carona Shoes, originally known as the Carona Sahu Shoe Company, was incorporated in 1953 and managed by the Sahu family until 1984. In 1984, the company headquarters in D N Road, Mumbai (near Fort) was engulfed by fire. In 1984, the company was acquired by the Khataus after which it got the present name.

History
The company previously manufactured canvas and rubber footwear. It had its manufacturing facilities in Mumbai (Jogeshwari), Aurangabad and Ahmedabad. In 1989, the company entered into a technical agreement with Puma AG Rudolf Dassler Sport, Germany, to manufacture sports and special application shoes. It came out with a public issue in June 1989 to set up a unit in Aurangabad to manufacture sports shoes. In 1995, there was a reshuffle in the management because of a split in the Khatau family. In addition to the labor problem, the company was also not able to cope up with the competition for lower segment products like canvas and rubber footwear. The company was incurring losses. Hence, in 1995, it disposed of its Jogeshwari plant where operations had been partially suspended since March 1994. Around 800 of its 1200 workers were retrenched through a Voluntary Retirement Scheme. The company renewed its agreement for five years with Puma in 1995. During the year 1999, the company was registered as a sick company under SICA 1985 and BIFR appointed Bank of India as its operating agency to expedite the preparation of the Draft of Rehabilitation Scheme (with inputs from India Infoline).

In its prime, Carona was a heritage brand of India and the second largest footwear company in India. Carona was a brand which thrived during the license control regime in India. The brand thrived alongside, and fought head on with the market leader Bata. The shops and the products were extremely similar. When Bata launched one style, Carona quickly followed suit. Both Bata and Carona were instrumental in popularizing canvas shoes in India. These shoes were a rage among kids at that time.

In the nineties, new brands began to enter the market with new designs and fashion. Foreign brands like Nike, Reebok and Adidas began to market their products aggressively which further worsened the position of Carona.

Bata had the backing of its foreign parent which helped it work through the restructuring exercise, but Carona did not have that backing. Bata was able to sustain itself by launching new models at affordable prices, while Carona was not able to meet the market with new launches. Both Bata and Carona had own showrooms which became expensive to maintain. Carona went in to the BIFR fold in 1998.

References

External links
Jordan Sneakers
Replica Sneakers

Shoe companies of India
Indian companies established in 1953
Clothing companies established in 1953
Manufacturing companies based in Mumbai
Defunct companies based in Mumbai
1953 establishments in Bombay State